William Henry Hiner (December 16, 1821April 29, 1880) was an American manufacturing businessman, and Republican politician, and Wisconsin pioneer.  He was the 14th mayor of Fond du Lac, Wisconsin, and represented Fond du Lac County for six years in the Wisconsin State Senate.  He also served as president pro tempore of the Senate during the 1877 session.

Biography

Born in Bedford, Pennsylvania, he moved to Fond du Lac, Wisconsin in 1850. He was one of the owners of the Union Iron Works in Fond du Lac. He served on the Fond du Lac County, Wisconsin Board of Supervisors and on the Fond du Lac Common Council. Hiner also served as mayor of Fond du Lac. From 1872 until 1879, he served in the Wisconsin State Senate, as a Republican, and also served as President pro tem of the Wisconsin Senate. He died in Fond du Lac, Wisconsin, in 1880.

References

1821 births
1880 deaths
People from Bedford, Pennsylvania
Politicians from Fond du Lac, Wisconsin
Businesspeople from Wisconsin
County supervisors in Wisconsin
Wisconsin city council members
Mayors of places in Wisconsin
Republican Party Wisconsin state senators
19th-century American politicians
19th-century American businesspeople